Branko Mirković (born October 5, 1982) is a Serbian-Bulgarian professional basketball player who currently plays for Pieno žvaigždės Pasvalys of the Lithuanian Basketball League.

Professional career 
During his career, Mirković played for KK Smederevo 1953, KK Pelister, BC Rilski Sportist, PBC Lukoil Academic and KK Igokea.

On July 24, 2013, he signed with BC Tsmoki-Minsk.

On June 21, 2020, he has signed with Pieno žvaigždės Pasvalys of the Lithuanian Basketball League.

Bulgarian national basketball team 
In 2013, Mirković accepted to play for the Bulgaria national basketball team after which he received a Bulgarian passport.

See also 
 List of foreign basketball players in Serbia

References

External links
  at eurobasket.com
  at vtb-league.com
  at fiba.com
  at eurobasket2015.org
  at sportal.bg
  at sportal.bg

1982 births
Living people
Basketball players from Belgrade
BC Kalev/Cramo players
BC Rilski Sportist players
BC Tsmoki-Minsk players
Bulgarian basketball players
Bulgarian expatriate basketball people in Serbia
Bulgarian men's basketball players
Bulgarian people of Serbian descent
CSM Oradea (basketball) players
KK Igokea players
KK Smederevo players
Korvpalli Meistriliiga players
Naturalised citizens of Bulgaria
PBC Academic players
Point guards
Serbian expatriate basketball people in Belarus
Serbian expatriate basketball people in Belgium
Serbian expatriate basketball people in Bosnia and Herzegovina
Serbian expatriate basketball people in Bulgaria
Serbian expatriate basketball people in Estonia
Serbian expatriate basketball people in Lithuania
Serbian expatriate basketball people in North Macedonia
Serbian expatriate basketball people in Romania